Ossian Skiöld (22 June 1889 – 22 August 1961) was a Swedish hammer thrower. He competed at the 1924, 1928, and 1932 Olympics and finished in fifth, second and fourth place, respectively. He also placed fourth at the 1934 European Championships. Skiöld was policeman by profession.

References

Swedish male hammer throwers
Olympic silver medalists for Sweden
Athletes (track and field) at the 1924 Summer Olympics
Athletes (track and field) at the 1928 Summer Olympics
Athletes (track and field) at the 1932 Summer Olympics
Olympic athletes of Sweden
1961 deaths
1889 births
Medalists at the 1928 Summer Olympics
Olympic silver medalists in athletics (track and field)